The 1973 Detroit Tigers compiled a record of 85–77.  They finished in 3rd place in the AL East, 12 games behind the Baltimore Orioles.  They were outscored by their opponents 674 to 642.

Offseason 
 November 30, 1972: Rich Reese was purchased by the Tigers from the Minnesota Twins.

Regular season 
 April 16, 1973: Steve Busby threw the first no-hitter in Kansas City Royals history against the Tigers. The Royals beat Detroit by a score of 3–0.

Season standings

Record vs. opponents

Notable transactions 
 April 2, 1973: Tim Hosley was traded by the Tigers to the Oakland Athletics for Don Shaw.
 June 5, 1973: Bob Adams was drafted by the Tigers in the 3rd round of the 1973 Major League Baseball draft.
 August 17, 1973: Rich Reese was released by the Tigers.

Roster

Player stats

Batting

Starters by position 
Note: Pos = Position; G = Games played; AB = At bats; H = Hits; Avg. = Batting average; HR = Home runs; RBI = Runs batted in

Other batters 
Note: G = Games played; AB = At bats; H = Hits; Avg. = Batting average; HR = Home runs; RBI = Runs batted in

Pitching

Starting pitchers 
Note: G = Games; IP = Innings pitched; W = Wins; L = Losses; ERA = Earned run average; SO = Strikeouts

Other pitchers 
Note: G = Games pitched; IP = Innings pitched; W = Wins; L = Losses; ERA = Earned run average; SO = Strikeouts

Relief pitchers 
Note: G = Games pitched; W = Wins; L = Losses; SV = Saves; GF = Games finished; ERA = Earned run average; SO = Strikeouts

Awards and honors 
 John Hiller, Hutch Award
 Al Kaline, Roberto Clemente Award
 Mickey Stanley, AL Gold Glove Award, outfield

League top ten finishers 
Ed Brinkman
 MLB leader in games played (162)
 AL leader in games played at shortstop (162)
 AL leader in complete games at shortstop (141)
 AL leader in innings played at shortstop (1390-2/3)
 #2 in AL in sacrifice hits (14)
 #2 in AL times grounded into double plays (22)

Joe Coleman
 AL leader in hit batsmen (10)
 #2 in AL in wins (23)
 #4 in AL in home runs allowed (32)
 #5 in MLB in games started (40)
 #9 in MLB in batters faced (1219)

Bill Freehan
 #2 in AL in times hit by pitch (11)

John Hiller
 MLB leader in saves (38)
 AL leader in games (65)
 AL leader in games finished (60)
 #5 in AL in win percentage (.667)

Al Kaline
 4th oldest player in AL (38)

Mickey Lolich
 #2 in MLB in games started (42)
 #2 in MLB in home runs allowed (35)
 #2 in MLB in hits allowed (315)
 #2 in AL in strikeout to walk ratio (2.71)
 #3 in MLB in earned runs allowed (131)
 #5 in AL in bases on balls per 9 innings pitched (2.30)
 #5 in AL in strikeouts (214)
 #5 in AL in wild pitches (12)
 #6 in MLB in batters faced (1286)
 #7 in MLB in innings pitched (308.7)

Aurelio Rodríguez
 AL leader in games played at third base (160)
 AL leader in complete games at third base (151)
 AL leader in innings played at third base (1394-2/3)
 #5 in AL in games played (160)

Mickey Stanley
 #4 in AL in outs (481)

Players ranking among top 100 all time at position 
The following members of the 1975 Detroit Tigers are among the Top 100 of all time at their position, as ranked by The Bill James Historical Baseball Abstract in 2001:
 Bill Freehan: 12th best catcher of all time
 Norm Cash: 20th best first baseman of all time 
 Aurelio Rodríguez: 91st best third baseman of all time
 Al Kaline: 11th best right fielder of all time
 Willie Horton: 55th best left fielder of all time 
 Mickey Lolich: 72nd best pitcher of all time

Farm system 

LEAGUE CHAMPIONS: Montgomery

References

External links 

 1973 Detroit Tigers Regular Season Statistics at Baseball Reference

Detroit Tigers seasons
Detroit Tigers season
Detroit Tiger
1973 in Detroit